Ionuț Chirilă (born 9 January 1966) is a Romanian football manager. He is the son of journalist Ioan Chirilă and actress Iarina Demian and brother of the singer Tudor Chirilă.

References

External links

Ionuț Chirilă at Labtof.ro

Living people
People from Gorj County
1966 births
Romanian football managers
CSM Jiul Petroșani managers
FC UTA Arad managers
CS Concordia Chiajna managers
FC Politehnica Iași (2010) managers
ASA 2013 Târgu Mureș managers
LPS HD Clinceni managers